Audi Arena Oberstdorf (from 2004 to 2017 Erdinger Arena, until 2004 Skisprungstadion am Schattenberg) is a complex of five ski jumping hills, located in the German town of Oberstdorf, Bavaria, on the northwestern slope of the Schattenberg mountain (1845 m).

On the largest hill of the complex, the Schattenbergschanze (meaning "Hill on Shadow Mountain"), with its K-120 and HS137, the first competition of the 4-Hills-Tournament takes place every year since 1952. The hill has held three FIS Nordic World Ski Championships – in 1987, 2005 and 2021. It is equipped with artificial lighting and stands for 27,005 seats.

There is also one normal hill K-95 (HS106), one middle hill K-56 (HS60) and two small hills K-30 (HS30) and K-19 (HS20).

The venue should not be confused with another one in Oberstdorf, the Heini Klopfer ski flying hill, about 7 kilometres to the south.

History
The construction of the ski jump according to a project of Hans Schwendiger started in 1925 and was finished on 27 December 1925. In 1930 the German championships were hosted on this hill (from 1901 to 1973 these were only held on large hills). The facility fell into decline during World War II, as the last competition here took place in 1941. The jump was renovated at the end of 1945 and on 1 January 1946 an occasional New Year's competition took place. A new stage in the history of the Schattenbergschanze was the invitation of the club SC Oberstdorf to host the 4-Hills-Tournament and on 4 January 1953 the second competition of the premiere edition was held on this hill.

At the end of 2003, the facility was extensively expanded at a cost of €16.6 million. The K-Point was moved from 115 meters to 120 meters and new stands were built for 27,005 people. On 26 December 2004, the official name of the complex was changed to Erdinger Arena and on 1 December 2017 to Audi Arena Oberstdorf. Both changes had to do with acquiring title sponsors for the venue – the Erdinger Weißbräu brewery and the Audi car manufacturer.

Schattenbergschanze was one of the first venues in the world to have an ice track cooling system.

References

Ski jumping venues in Germany
Four Hills Tournament
Sports venues in Bavaria
Sport in Oberstdorf